Imran Garda (born 7 August 1982) is a South African of Indian descent journalist, presenter, and award-winning novelist. He was the host of The Newsmakers on TRT World. He was formerly the host of Third Rail on Al Jazeera America based in New York City. Garda was also a senior presenter and producer for AJ+, Al Jazeera Media Network's all digital video news channel based in San Francisco. Previously, he worked for Al Jazeera English in Doha, Qatar and Washington, DC. He also hosted the award-winning show The Stream.

Early career
Garda's media career began as a sports presenter and reporter for SuperSport in South Africa in 2002. He covered mostly cricket and football. While at Supersport he was published as a freelance writer on politics—which included a series on Bosnia-Herzegovina ten years after the Yugoslav Wars ended.

With Al Jazeera
Garda worked in two different stints at Al Jazeera.

First stint

Garda joined Al Jazeera English in 2006 initially as a sports presenter, but was moved to news during the piloting phase. He anchored the news and Inside Story from Doha, Kuala Lumpur and Washington DC. He also hosted the award-winning (RTS) The Stream until he left the network in 2012. He reported from the US, Sudan, Turkey, Egypt, Namibia, Bahrain, Lesotho, India, South Africa and the Hajj in Saudi Arabia. Garda hosted a 13-part series on the aftermath of the War in Gaza - Focus on Gaza and presented the long-form documentaries The Father of the Turks, A Voyage of Life and Death and India's Silent War. He also contributed feature articles and blog posts to Aljazeera.com and The Huffington Post. On 7 June 2012, Al Jazeera English announced that Garda would be returning to South Africa.

Second stint
In 2013, Garda returned to the network for the network's digital channel AJ+ based in San Francisco, California where he specialized in short documentaries, including a special on Black Lives Matter protesters in Ferguson, Missouri. Beginning in 2015, Garda also anchored the news at Al Jazeera America in New York City. On 16 April 2015 it was announced that Garda would host a show on Al Jazeera America called Third Rail, an hour-long, guest-driven debate program focused on under-reported stories and hot-button topics.

TRT World
In October 2015, Garda joined TRT World, Turkish Radio and Television Corporation's English-language channel as host of The Newsmakers, an interview and debate program with "in-depth reports and strong, unfiltered debates - examining the people and the stories that are shaping our lives."

In April 2016 Garda and his colleague Jerome Evans were given rare access to make a documentary in North Korea during the Pyongyang Marathon. Garda documented the challenges of doing journalism in the country.

The Newsmakers also did a special show from London on the occasion of the historic Brexit referendum.

Novel: The Thunder That Roars
In June 2014 Umuzi, an imprint of Penguin Random House published Garda's debut novel The Thunder That Roars. The book was awarded the 2015 Olive Schreiner Prize for prose and optioned for a feature film. A tale of a journalist who embarks on a journey to find a missing family friend and uncovers long-held family secrets and undergoes an inward journey of his own, the book was described by adjudicators as, "South African literature [that] soars above the tortuous apartheid history and redefines globalisation." Reviewer Eric Garland called it, "[A] breathtakingly strong debut novel about the self-discovery and strained relationships of human beings in an era that defies understanding." It was also long-listed for The Etisalat Prize for Literature.

Big interviews
Garda has interviewed many influential people throughout his career. They include former UK Prime Minister Gordon Brown, former President of Afghanistan Hamid Karzai, US Ambassador to Iraq Christopher Hill, former Pakistan President General Pervez Musharraf, UN Humanitarian Chief Stephen O'Brien, Former Israeli Ambassador to the UN Dan Gillerman, Ukrainian President Petro Poroshenko, former Chief UN Weapons Inspector in Iraq Richard Butler, former US Special Envoy to Sudan Scott Gration, Former President of Georgia and Governor of Odessa Oblast Mikheil Saakashvili, former UK Prime Minister Tony Blair, former UN Special Envoy to Afghanistan Kai Eide, former Irish President Mary Robinson, former IAEA Chief Hans Blix, WikiLeaks founder Julian Assange, NASA Administrator Charles Bolden, Former Iraq Prime Minister and Vice President Ayad Allawi, Tibetan PM in exile Lobsang Sangay, Rwandan Foreign Minister Louise Mushikiwabo, UN Human Rights Chief Navi Pillay, Spanish judge Baltasar Garzon, ICC Chief prosecutor Luis Moreno-Ocampo, former UN Humanitarian Chief John Holmes, Bosnian President Haris Silajdzic, UN Deputy Secretary General Jan Eliasson, philosopher Slavoj Zizek, former US Ambassador to Syria Robert Ford, former Iranian Chief Nuclear Negotiator Seyed Hossein Mousavian, and former cricketer turned politician and Current Prime Minister of Pakistan Imran Khan.

Garda has interviewed spokespersons and ministers from governments across the world. He has also had the opportunity to interview non-state actors from groups such as Hamas, Somali rebel groups, Chechen rebels, Uganda's LRA, and other designated terror groups. He has chaired panels for the World Humanitarian Summit, United Nations Human Rights Council, and Advertising Week.

References

External links

 Imran Garda's Twitter account

Al Jazeera people
South African Muslims
Living people
South African journalists
South African people of Indian descent
1982 births
South African people of Gujarati descent